Chairmen of the Chamber of the People

Below is a list of office-holders:

Sources

Chamber of People